is a private junior college in Toshima, Tokyo, Japan. It was established in April 1952.

External links
  

Private universities and colleges in Japan
Educational institutions established in 1952
Universities and colleges in Tokyo
Japanese junior colleges
1952 establishments in Japan